Arthur Webb-Jones  (1875 – 30 April 1917) was an eminent British gynaecologist who served extensively as a surgeon with the British Army in Egypt.

Birth and Family

Arthur, who was born in Glamorgan, was the second son of William Matthew Jones (b. 1838), who was an owner of the trans-European steamship agency M. Jones and Brothers (est. 1856), by Agnes Ida Long (1845 – 1899). His elder sibling was Ernest William Jones (b. December 1870 - 1941) who was a first-class cricketer who inherited ownership of M. Jones and Brothers (est. 1856) and who was the father of the choral conductor James William Webb-Jones. His cousins included Edwin Price Jones, who was Vice-Consul for Chile, and Secretary to the Chamber of Commerce, and William (Bill) Wynn Jones was Anglican Bishop of Central Tanganyika from 1946 until his death by car accident in 1951.

Career

Arthur Webb-Jones was educated at Malvern College (1890 - 1893, School Prefect), and at St Thomas' Hospital, and at the University of London (LRCP, 1899; BS, 1911; MD, 1913), where the subject of his MD thesis was "Bilharziosis in Women". His notable published works include 'Lumbar Hernia' (The Lancet, 1902, ii, 747)) and 'Two Cases of Gynaecomastia' (Ibid, 1904, i, 865). He became a Fellow of the Royal College of Surgeons of England on 31 May 1900.

Webb-Jones from 1900 to 1904 served in the Egyptian Army in the Sudan, where he subsequently settled and established a private practice at Rue Stamboul, Alexandria, and was appointed Surgeon and Gynaecologist to the Government Hospital and Medical Officer to the Egyptian State Railway, Alexandria District. He received the thanks of the Sirdar and Governor-General of the Sudan for his services. He resided in Egypt from 1913 to 1917.

Webb Jones during the Gallipoli Campaign served as a yeoman with the British Army from May 1915 to December 1916.

When, in spring 1917, there occurred epidemic of typhus in Alexandria, Webb-Jones gave an intravenous injection of saline solution to another practitioner, who was dying from typhus, by which he fatally infected himself, a consequence of which he died eleven days later on 30 April 1917. His death warranted a mention in a special intelligence report to the Houses of Parliament, which was published in The Lancet.

Marriage
Arthur Webb-Jones married Lillian Bell Long (1875 – 1907) in 1906 and the couple had three children:

Francis Arthur John Webb-Jones (later Wakeman-Long) (b. 21 October 1910, Marylebone, London – d. 1986, Dover) who changed his surname to Wakeman-Long for his marriage. Francis was a barrister who served as Chairman of M. Jones and Brothers (est. 1856) until its dissolution in 1942.
Marjorie Agnes Webb-Jones (1912 – 2005) Married Lionel C. Lord Sept 1935 at Kensington.
 Arthur (17 June 1917, Alexandria – 1965) . Captain in the Royal Army Medical Corps. Married Doreen Ariadne Elwood (1921 – 2016).

References 

People educated at Malvern College
Alumni of the University of London
English surgeons
Fellows of the Royal College of Surgeons
British gynaecologists
Royal Army Medical Corps officers
People from Glamorgan
1875 births
1917 deaths
British Army personnel of World War I
British military personnel killed in World War I
Deaths from typhus
British expatriates in Egypt